Morpheus is an American computer game released in 1998.

Gameplay 
The game is a first-person adventure game similar to Myst with a point and click interface however, the player may also pan around a location by clicking and dragging the mouse. Clicking the mouse to go in a certain direction results in a transition video showing the player's movement.

Reception 
Morpheus became a hit in Spain, with sales of 50,000 units in that region. Bob Mandel of The Adrenaline Vault gave the game the "Seal of Excellence".

References

External links
Morpheus on Itch.io
 

1998 video games
Adventure games
First-person adventure games
Classic Mac OS games
Single-player video games
Video games developed in the United States
Video games about virtual reality
Windows games